Shahrak-e Emam (also Romanized as Shahrak-e Emām) is a village in Rizab Rural District, Qatruyeh District, Neyriz County, Fars Province, Iran. At the 2006 census, its population was 2,746, in 578 families.

References 

Populated places in Neyriz County